Interligne is a front-line organization that, through its listening, intervention and awareness services, contributes to the well-being of people concerned with sexual diversity and gender plurality.

Mission and values

Interligne is a front-line centre for help and information for people affected by sexual diversity and gender diversity. Through its 24-hour service, it provides support to LGBTQ+ people, their loved ones and community, school, health and social service staff. Through its outreach activities, it also promote a greater openness of society towards the realities of LGBTQ+ people.

At Interligne, everyone is united around common values. Its actions are primarily aimed at restoring LGBTQ+ communities their power to act while ensuring their inclusion in the different spheres of society. None of this would be possible if its work was not imbued with  benevolence  and a thirst for social justice  for everyone.

Services
Interligne services includes:

 Help, information and references by phone and text messaging at 1-888-505-1010 (24/7);
 Help, information and references by private chat;
 Help, information and references by e-mail;
 A Frequently asked questions about LGBTQ+ realities (FAQ );
 Youth programs;
 Violence programs;
 Awareness campaigns;
 And much more…

History
Gay Line was founded in 1976 by activists who wanted to provide a helpline with information and advice to gay and lesbian people in Montreal. It was part of what was called the "Gay Social Services Project" of the Ville Marie Social Services Centre and was staffed by volunteers and professional social workers, who offered counseling services. In the late 1990s, Gay Line widened its scope to include bisexual and transgender people. It operated until 2012. 

In the early 1980s, a similar version of the helpline was formed in Quebec called Gai Écoute. Since 2017, Gai Écoute has become Centre Interligne Inc.

“Since our inception in 1980, we have been listening and supporting people of all sexual orientations and gender identities. In recent years, we have felt that the name Gai Écoute was out of step with our reality. We then began a long process of studying our own brand identity and how best to convey this openness,” explains Pascal Vaillancourt, executive director of Interligne. “Above all, the goal is to reach everyone so that no one is isolated,”says Robert Asselin, president of Interligne. 

Interligne, has been now working for over 40 years to provide its services for both French-speaking and English-speaking members of the LGBTQ+ communities across Canada. In 2019-2020, Interligne has received over 36 000 help request from members of the LGBTQ+ communities across the world.

References

External links
 Official site of Interligne
Official site of Gay Line (organization dissolved in 2012) 
Gay Line History at CAEO Quebec

LGBT culture in Montreal
LGBT organizations in Canada
Non-profit organizations based in Montreal
Organizations established in 1976
Crisis hotlines
1976 establishments in Quebec